American Horror Stories is an American anthology horror television series created by Ryan Murphy and Brad Falchuk for FX on Hulu. Premiered on July 15, 2021, the series serves as the third installment in the American Story media franchise and a direct spin-off from American Horror Story. Returning cast members from the original show include Matt Bomer, Celia Finkelstein, Naomi Grossman, John Carroll Lynch, Charles Melton, Billie Lourd, Chad James Buchanan, Cody Fern, Dylan McDermott, Jamie Brewer, Denis O'Hare, Matt Lasky, Gabourey Sidibe, Max Greenfield, Austin Woods, Seth Gabel, Rebecca Dayan, Cameron Cowperthwaite, Spencer Neville, and Teddy Sears.

In August 2021, the series was renewed for a second season, which premiered on July 21, 2022.

Premise
A weekly anthology series where each episode tells a different horror story.

Some episodes of this show are connected to past American Horror Story seasons. The episodes "Rubber(wo)Man Pt. 1 & 2" and "Game Over" are connected with American Horror Story: Murder House while "Dollhouse" is connected with American Horror Story: Coven.

Production

Development
On May 11, 2020, Murphy revealed that a spin-off series named American Horror Stories was being developed; it would feature self-contained anthological episodes, instead of a season-long story arc as featured in American Horror Story. The first season consists of seven episodes. On August 13, 2021, FX renewed the series for a second season of eight episodes.

Casting
Matt Bomer, Gavin Creel, Sierra McCormick, Paris Jackson, Belissa Escobedo, Merrin Dungey, Selena Sloan, Ashley Martin Carter, Valerie Loo, Kaia Gerber, Aaron Tveit and Celia Finkelstein starred in the first two episodes. Other American Horror Story alums who appeared in the first season include Naomi Grossman, John Carroll Lynch, Charles Melton, Billie Lourd, Chad James Buchanan, Cody Fern, Dylan McDermott and Jamie Brewer along with newcomers Rhenzy Feliz, Madison Bailey, Ben J. Pierce, Leonardo Cecchi, Kyle Red Silverstein, Brandon Papo, Amy Grabow, Adrienne Barbeau, Kevin McHale, Nico Greetham, Dyllón Burnside, Taneka Johnson, Danny Trejo, Ronen Rubinstein, Virginia Gardner, Vanessa E. Williams, Michael B. Silver, Kimberley Drummond, Jake Choi, Misha Gonz-Cirkl, Tiffany Dupont, Blake Shields, Colin Tandberg, Mercedes Mason, Noah Cyrus, Adam Hagenbuch, John Brotherton, Nicolas Bechtel and Tom Lenk.

Nico Greetham and Cody Fern returned for the second season. Denis O'Hare, Matt Lasky, Gabourey Sidibe, Max Greenfield, Austin Woods, Seth Gabel, Rebecca Dayan, Cameron Cowperthwaite, Spencer Neville and Teddy Sears, who appeared in previous seasons of  American Horror Story, appeared in the second season along with newcomers Kristine Froseth, Houston Towe, Abby Corrigan, Simone Recasner, Maryssa Menendez, Emily Morales-Cabrera, Caitlin Dulany, Joel Swetow, Lily Rohren, Vince Yap, Nancy Linehan Charles, Bella Thorne, Anthony De La Torre, Billie Bodega, Julia Schlaepfer, Addison Timlin, Ian Sharkey, Dominique Jackson, Quvenzhané Wallis, Raven Scott, Kyla Drew, Kyanna Simone, Shane Callahan, Ryan Madison, Tiffany Yvonne Cox, Judith Light, Britt Lower, Todd Waring, Cornelia Guest, Madison Iseman, Jeff Doucette, Sara Silva, Jessika Van, Chelsea M. Davis, Alicia Silverstone, Olivia Rouyre, Bobby Hogan, Heather Wynters and Jarrod Crawford.

Filming
On August 4, 2020, it was announced that Sarah Paulson was set to direct an episode on the series; she ultimately did not do so.

Title sequences
Every episode of the series has its own title sequence, with the exception of the first and second episodes, which share the same one, to connect to the theme of each episode. The title sequence was created by Elastic. The same theme music and font of American Horror Story is used during the opening credits. "The Naughty List", the fourth episode of the first season, uses the same remix of the theme music as American Horror Story: 1984 but high pitched.

Episodes

Season 1 (2021)

Season 2 (2022)

Marketing
On November 12, 2020, Murphy unveiled a promotional poster of the series via his Instagram account and announced a first season of sixteen hour-long episodes, many of which will feature actors who have appeared in American Horror Story.

On June 23, 2021, FX released two more promotional posters for the show and a teaser trailer that featured the Rubber Woman.
On July 8, 2021, FX released the official trailer for the series. On June 21, 2022, FX released the promotional poster for the second season. On June 30, 2022, FX released the official teaser trailer for the second season that featured humanoid dolls. On July 13, 2022, FX released the official trailer for the second season.

Release
The series was set to air on FX; however, on June 22, 2020, it was announced that American Horror Stories would stream on FX on Hulu instead. American Horror Stories premiered on July 15, 2021. Internationally, the series became available through Disney+ under the dedicated streaming hub Star starting on August 25, 2021. In Latin America, the series premieres as a Star+ original.

Reception

Audience viewership

Season one 
According to Whip Media's viewership tracking app TV Time, American Horror Stories was the second most anticipated new television series during the month of July 2021, and the second most anticipated returning television series during the month of July 2022.

Season two 
According to Whip Media's viewership tracking app TV Time, American Horror Stories was the tenth most streamed original television series across all platforms, in the United States, during the week of August 7, 2022, the ninth during the week of August 21, 2022, the seventh during the week of August 28, 2022, the fifth during the week of September 4, 2022, and the fifth during the week of September 11, 2022.

Critical response
On the review aggregator Rotten Tomatoes, American Horror Stories has an overall score of 66%.

Season one
On Rotten Tomatoes, the first season has a score of 52% with an average score of 4.6/10, based on 39 reviews. The website's critics consensus is, "American Horror Stories has its moments, but a lack of consistent narrative quality among installments and not enough scares make for an unsatisfying whole." On Metacritic, the season scored 54 out of 100, based on 5 reviews, indicating "mixed or average reviews".

Inkoo Kang of The Washington Post stated, "Murphy and Falchuk have created a supercharged version of their own show with the spinoff “American Horror Stories,” which debuted last week on FX on Hulu. The series, which will feature new stories with each episode (rather than every season), is off to a promising start with “Rubber(wo)Man,” its two-part premiere. Set in the “Murder House” where the first iteration of “American Horror Story” took place, the definitely lower-budget but winkingly fun episodes channel the juiciest elements of that season, a barbed sendup of Los Angeles narcissism with a love-hate relationship to Old Hollywood and a deliberately queasy teen romance fueling the bloody antics." Phil Owen of TheWrap asserted, "There’s a pattern we’ve seen play out with “American Horror Story” during each of the past several seasons: A compelling start, followed by a steady decline into incoherence. The process has been speeding up — “AHS: 1984,” the most recent season, was off the rails by the midway point. This is the double-edged sword of the Ryan Murphy brand. The shows under his umbrella are loud, boisterous, audacious, hilarious, intense — and generally just not like other shows. While that uniqueness and that tonally erratic signature is the reason we watch this stuff, it also makes it easier for things to get out of control because it's really tough to balance all those moods “American Horror Stories,” which is streaming only through FX on Hulu, provides what feels like the perfect solution to that problem, by keeping its stories bite-sized. Yes, the two stories we’ve gotten so far have each followed the “AHS” pattern — the compelling initial premise that leads to an off-the-rails conclusion — but they don't wear out their welcome." Erin Maxwell of LA Weekly said, "American Horror Stories is about mayhem and monsters and the blood of the innocent. It's about everything and anything Ryan Murphy can do with the color red, in fact. In Murphy's world, mutilated penises and latex-adorned serial killers are a dime a dozen, even if coherent stories are not. If you're a fan of the series and the deranged universe it inhabits, well, good news! All of those elements remain intact, sans the meandering narratives that seemed to stretch into eternity, and made a lot of us give up on past seasons. American Horror Stories is a gruesome, gross-out trip that will leave viewers with an uneasy feeling of terror – a perfect addition to the AHS universe."

Joel Keller of Decider wrote, "American Horror Stories takes Murphy’s and Falchuk’s indulgences and compresses them down so they’re easier to tolerate. Yes, they’re still there, but the time limitations help them concentrate on story, character and gore, which is why people like the AHS franchise so much." Cheryl Eddy of Gizmodo called American Horror Stories a "dark and twisted delight", saying, "Some of these entries are more effective than others—“Drive In” owes so much to John Carpenter's Masters of Horror episode “Cigarette Burns” that it can't be a coincidence that frequent Carpenter leading lady Adrienne Barbeau has a role in it. But they're all energetic and entertaining, telling separate stories that nonetheless cohere with American Horror Story’s in-your-face approach to sex and gore. And it’s worth noting this isn’t The Twilight Zone or even Shudder’s excellent Creepshow (speaking of Barbeau), which tend to build their stories around characters who need to be taught a lesson or handed down some kind of comeuppance. “The Naughty List” does take a particularly ruthless approach to punishing the odious social-media stars who populate its story, and American Horror Stories absolutely loves to drop surprises in the final moments of its episodes. But this show isn't piloted by a standard-issue moral compass; much like American Horror Story, American Horror Stories is mostly just determined to shock you. Gleefully. And most of the time, it succeeds." Dan Auty of GameSpot included American Horror Stories in their "16 Best Horror Shows To Watch On Hulu" in October 2021, stating, "Rather than tell the same story across an entire season, this new spin-off from American Horror Story delivers standalone self-contained episodes. Some of the first season's seven episodes are linked to previous AHS characters, while others are entirely new--but all deliver the same mix of creepy horror, surreal humor, and melodrama as the main show."

Kristen Lopez of IndieWire graded the first season with a "D," stating, "The cast in every episode is pretty solid, made up of a mix of Murphy alumni, children of celebrities, and others who probably had nothing to do in Los Angeles during this pandemic. But too often the series refuses to trust its talent; the pilot alone has the likes of Bomer, Creel, Aaron Tveit, and Merrin Dungey yet barely gives them anything to do. Danny Trejo is only there to stare menacingly. And who wastes Adrienne Barbeau in a horror series? Any goodwill built into the Murphy Television Universe is pretty depleted already, and “American Horror Stories” is another example of what feels like fumes being used to create a fire. The show is the entertainment equivalent of empty calories. It's good enough to watch in the moment, but you'll either leave feeling nothing, or with a nasty stomach ache." Angelica Guarino of Common Sense Media rated the first season 2 out of 5 stars, writing, "American Horror Stories is a horror-comedy show spearheaded by the same creative team behind the 2011 release American Horror Story; most elements in American Horror Storiesare remarkably similar to the original. This title continues to capitalize on creator Ryan Murphy's trademark attempt at balancing comedy and drama to create a uniquely cringe-worthy tone. Also true to the original is the emphasis on sex and violence. American Horror Stories contains graphic sequences of gore and use of weapons, as well as content linking teen sexuality and violence in disturbing ways."

Season 2 
On Rotten Tomatoes, the second season has a score of 80% with average rating of 6.30/10, based on 5 reviews.

Swara Ramaswamy of The Michigan Daily stated, "The second season of “American Horror Stories” had its fair share of gems, and it almost makes up for the fact that we don't have much information about season eleven of “American Horror Story.” While the episodes were drastically different from each other, there was no trouble getting into the plot. And while several episodes delivered the sense of endless dread characteristic of “AHS,” it was evident that a few others lost their way. Murphy and Falchuk showed us that the perfect balance of plot, acting and callbacks to fan-favorite episodes of “American Horror Story” makes for a successful spinoff of a beloved show." Johnny Loftus of Decider wrote, "The episodic pace of American Horror Stories keeps the action lean and satisfying, and its sense of humor is as welcome as the foreboding and sidelong connections back into the AHS narrative mothership." Vanessa Maki of The Mary Sue asserted, "American Horror Stories season 2 was a tremendous improvement. Almost every episode popped off and several were simply *chef’s kiss.* They fixed many of the bugs and issues in the first season, and now, it’s truly living up to its promise."

Robert Vaux of CBR.com said, "The first season couldn't quite escape that shadow, with a few good episodes (and several fair-to-middling ones) scattered amid multiple unnecessary excursions back to the franchise's infamous Murder House. Season 2 upped its game, making just a single pointed reference to its parent series and focusing on telling good stories rather than reminding people where it came from." Brecken Hunter Wellborn of Collider praised Nico Greetham's performance across the second season of American Horror Stories, asserting, "Significantly, Greetham’s performance in “Drive” is drastically different from the work he did in either of his original AHS outings. [...] Though he has now made three supporting appearances in the franchise, American Horror Stories Season 2 proves the AHS franchise needs to make Greetham a leading member of the franchise's recurring ensemble."  Nick Perry, Michileen Martin, and Blair Marnell of Digital Trends included American Horror Stories in their "Best Hulu original series" list of October 2022.

Accolades

References

External links 
 
 

American Horror Story
2020s American drama television series
2020s American horror television series
2020s American supernatural television series
2020s American anthology television series
2020s American LGBT-related drama television series
2021 American television series debuts
American horror fiction television series
American television spin-offs
English-language television shows
FX on Hulu original programming
Horror drama television series
American thriller television series
Television series created by Brad Falchuk
Television series created by Ryan Murphy (writer)
Television series by 20th Century Fox Television
Television shows filmed in Los Angeles